The 2006–07 Minnesota Golden Gophers women's ice hockey team were a women's ice hockey team from Minnesota, in the 2006-07 season.

Offseason
September 2007: Former Gopher women's hockey greats Erica Killewald and Nadine Muzerall (Class of 2001) will be inducted into the University of Minnesota's M Club Hall of Fame on Thursday Sept. 27, 2007. Killewald and Muzerall are two of 13 Gopher greats to be inducted at the annual Hall of Fame Banquet. The duo are the first women's hockey players to be inducted into the hall of fame and the youngest in the group of 13.

Regular season
Kelli Blankenship was in her freshman season and appeared in every game. For the season, she scored nine goals and six assists for 15 points (including three power-play goals and one game-winning goal).  On October 7, she scored two goals in an overtime loss against New Hampshire. Against WCHA rival Ohio State, she notched two goals in the 4-1 win (played on October 27). The weekend of December 9 and 10, Blankenship had a stellar series against North Dakota. She earned a career-high three points in the 8-1 win on December 9, and then she scored the Gophers’ only goal in the 1-0 win the next day. 
Melanie Gagnon was in her sophomore season and missed two games to compete with the Canadian Under-22 Team in January.  Her five goals and 22 assists for 27 points, ranked first among defensemen. She ranked sixth in WCHA in scoring among defensemen. During the Easton Shootout (played on October 6 and 7), she had three assists. Her first power-play goal of the season was scored on October 27 in a 4-1 win over Ohio State. In an 8-1 victory over North Dakota, she scored a goal and an assist (game played on December 1).  • Posted five points against North Dakota and was later named the WCHA Defensive Player of the Week for her performance (1/27-28) • Netted a career-best goal and two assists for three points in the 5-1 win against UND (1/28) •  
Gigi Marvin was in her sophomore season. She led the team in scoring with 38 points (she ranked second on the team in goals (18), while her 20 assists ranked third). On the power play, she led the team with 10 power-play goals and 11 assists for 21 points. In addition, she netted six game-winning goals.  During the season, she had six and seven game scoring streaks this season. The six game streak was from Nov. 12-Dec. 10, while the seven game streak was from Jan. 13-Feb. 3. She held a .600 percent on the faceoff circle with 345 wins and 230 losses, a team best. To start the season, Marvin had a power-play goal against Maine (played on October 6) and would get her first game-winning goal of the season in the 4-1 win against Ohio State (played on October 27). Marvin had five points in the North Dakota series (played on January 27 and 28). In the series against St. Cloud State on February 2 and 3, Marvin would accumulate another five points. On February 10, she netted the game-winning goal in the 5-3 win over Bemidji State 
Dagney Willey was in her sophomore season and played in all 34 games for the Gophers to earn second letter. She posted four goals and 10 assists for 14 points and tied for second on the team in plus/minus rating. On October 22, she scored a goal and had five shots in the 3-3 tie against Wisconsin. She scored the first power-play goal of her career in a 4-1 win over St. Cloud State on November 18. In the 5-1 win over North Dakota on January 28, she tied a career-high with two assists.

Postseason
February 23–24: Melanie Gagnon tallied three points against Bemidji State in the first round of the WCHA playoffs.
On March 3, Gagnon scored an unassisted goal in the WCHA semifinal game against Minnesota Duluth. Gigi Marvin scored a power-play, game-winning goal in the overtime period to advance the Gophers to the WCHA Championship game. Dagney Willey allied a power-play assist in the 3-2 WCHA semifinal win over Minnesota Duluth.

International
Kelli Blankenship competed at the USA Hockey Winter Training Camp.
Melanie Gagnon, Canadian Under 22 Team
Gigi Marvin played for the U.S. Select Team at the 2006 Four Nation’s Cup and was later named to Team USA’s 2007 National Team, where she earned a silver medal at the IIHF Women’s World Hockey Championships

Awards and honors
Kelli Blankenship, WCHA Rookie of the Week (Week of October 29)
Kelli Blankenship, WCHA Rookie of the Week (Week of December 11)
Melanie Gagnon, All-WCHA Third Team selection
Melanie Gagnon, WCHA All-Academic and Academic All-Big Ten honouree
Gigi Marvin, All-WCHA First Team honoree
Gigi Marvin, WCHA Scholar Athlete
Gigi Marvin, WCHA All-Academic and Academic All-Big Ten honoree
Gigi Marvin, co-most valuable player, (along with Bobbi Ross)
Gigi Marvin, WCHA All-Tournament Team
Gigi Marvin, WCHA Offensive Player of the Week (week of February 4)
Dagney Willey, Ridder Award
Dagney Willey, WCHA All-Academic and Academic All-Big Ten honoree

References

External links
Official site

Minnesota
Minnesota Golden Gophers women's ice hockey seasons
Minn
Minne
Minne